Macromia zeylanica (Sri Lanka cruiser) is a species of dragonfly in the family Macromiidae. It is endemic to Sri Lanka.

See also
 List of odonates of Sri Lanka

References

 Animal diversity web
 Query Results
 Sri Lanka Biodiversity

Macromiidae
Insects described in 1927